Events from the year 1833 in Denmark.

Incumbents
 Monarch – Frederick VI
 Prime minister – Otto Joachim

Events

Undated

Births
 12 May – Georg Emil Hansen, photographer (died 1891)
 7 July – Ludvig Fenger, architect (died 1905)
 26 August – Christian Vilhelm Nielsen, architect (died 1910)

Deaths
 17 June  Louise Hegermann-Lindencrone, playwright and salonist (died 1778)
 30 November – Gerhard Ludvig Lahde, engraver (born 1765)

References

 
1830s in Denmark
Denmark
Years of the 19th century in Denmark